Gnilec is a river of Poland, a tributary of the Czernica in Czarne.

Rivers of Poland
Rivers of West Pomeranian Voivodeship
Rivers of Pomeranian Voivodeship